Wigger  is the surname of the following notable people:
 Angela Wigger (born 1975), Swiss political economist
 Arndt Wigger (born 1943), German linguist
 Deena Wigger (born 1966), American sports shooter
Friedrich Wigger (1825–1886), German archivist
 Jeremias Wigger (born 1975), Swiss cross country skier
John Wiggers (1917–2007), American professional basketball player
 Lones Wigger (1937–2017), American sports shooter, father of Deena
Nick Wiger (born 1980), American comedian, improviser, podcast personality, and television writer
 Ralf Harold Wigger (1899–1974), American character actor
Siri Wigger (born 2003), Swiss cross-country skier
 Stefan Wigger (1932–2013), German television actor
 Winand Wigger (1841–1901), American Bishop of Newark

See also
Wiggers